Douglas M. Fasciale (born November 5, 1960) is an American lawyer who serves as an associate justice of the Supreme Court of New Jersey. He is a former judge of the New Jersey Superior Court, Appellate Division. In August 2022, he was appointed by Chief Justice Stuart Rabner as a temporary associate justice of the Supreme Court of New Jersey. In October 2022, he was confirmed to a permanent position on the court.

Early life and education 

Fasciale was born on November 5, 1960 in Hackensack, New Jersey. He received a Bachelor of Arts from Seton Hall University in 1982 and a Juris Doctor from Seton Hall University School of Law in 1986.

Career 

Fasciale  was a partner with  Hoagland, Longo, Moran, Dunst & Doukas until 2004. He was appointed to the New Jersey Superior Court by Governor Jim McGreevey and assumed office on November 5, 2004. He served in the special civil part of the superior court as well as the family, civil, and criminal parts of the Superior Court, including terms as presiding judge of both the civil and criminal parts. On June 23, 2010, Chief Justice Stuart Rabner announced that Fasciale would be elevated to the appellate division of the superior court, effective August 1, 2010.

New Jersey Supreme Court

Appointment 
In August 2022, Fasciale was one of three judges temporarily appointed by Chief Justice Stuart Rabner to fill the vacancies left by retirements in order to bring the court up to a full roster.

Nomination 

In June 2022, Fasciale was rumored to be on a shortlist for appointment to the New Jersey Supreme Court. On September 14, 2022, Governor Phil Murphy announced his intent to nominate Fasciale to serve as an associate justice of the Supreme Court of New Jersey.  Governor Murphy will nominate Fasciale to the seat vacated by Justice Faustino J. Fernandez-Vina, who retired on February 15, 2022. The announcement comes as a deal reached with Senator Holly Schepisi for her to lift her hold on the nomination of Rachel Wainer Apter. On October 13, 2022, his nomination was voted out of committee by a unanimous vote. On October 17, 2022, his nomination was confirmed by a 37–0 vote. He was sworn into office on October 21, 2022.

Personal life 

Fasciale lives in Westfield, New Jersey with his wife Teresa and two sons. He is a Republican.

References

External links 

1960 births
Living people
20th-century American lawyers
21st-century American judges
21st-century American lawyers
Justices of the Supreme Court of New Jersey
New Jersey lawyers
New Jersey Republicans
New Jersey state court judges
People from Hackensack, New Jersey
People from Westfield, New Jersey
Seton Hall University alumni
Seton Hall University School of Law alumni